Pileh Sara (also Romanized as Pīleh Sarā) is a village in Tutaki Rural District, in the Central District of Siahkal County, Gilan Province, Iran. At the 2006 census, its population was 34, in 7 families.

References 

Populated places in Siahkal County